Montagnea arenaria is a species of secotioid fungus in the family Agaricaceae. Originally named Agaricus arenarius by Augustin Pyramus de Candolle in 1815, it was transferred to the genus Montagnea by Sanford Myron Zeller in 1943. The species is characterized by a cap that has an apical disc, radial gills, a hymenophore, and spores with a prominent germ pore. It is inedible.

References

External links

Agaricaceae
Fungi described in 1815
Fungi of Europe
Fungi of North America
Inedible fungi
Secotioid fungi